The Museum of Women is scheduled to open in a five floor building that was formerly home to Topshop at 480 Broadway in SoHo in the summer of 2022.
The museum was founded by Abby Trott and will offer interactive exhibits and a gift shop featuring products made by women. Its physical location is expected to run through the end of 2022 at least and will explore issues faced by women in contemporary society and culture.

References

External links

SoHo, Manhattan
Organizations established in 2022
Museums in Manhattan
Proposed museums in the United States
Women's museums
Women in New York City